Three Japanese destroyers have been named Hatakaze (the Japanese word for "flag wind"):

 JDS Hatakaze (DD-182), an Asakaze-class destroyer of the Japan Maritime Self-Defense Force, launched in 1954 and deleted in 1969, formerly USS Macomb (DD-458).
 , lead ship of the Hatakaze class

See also
 , a class of four destroyers of the Japanese Maritime Self-Defense Force in 1984.

Japan Maritime Self-Defense Force ship names
Japanese Navy ship names
Ships of the Japan Maritime Self-Defense Force